Fred Brown is an Australian former rugby league footballer who played in the 1940s.

Playing career
Ex Newcastle centre, Fred Brown played  in first grade at St. George for three seasons between 1945 and 1947, including the 1946 Grand Final. He was a star in the Country Firsts rugby league team in 1944.

After sitting out the 1948 season, he return for one season at Balmain in 1949 before retiring.

References

St. George Dragons players
Balmain Tigers players
Australian rugby league players
Country New South Wales rugby league team players
Possibly living people
Year of birth missing
Rugby league centres
Place of birth missing